John Dornin Eldredge  (August 30, 1904 – September 23, 1961) was an American film and television actor. He was the younger brother of character actor George Eldredge (1898–1977).

Early life
Eldredge was born August 30, 1904 in San Francisco. He was the son of a clergyman who made a speciality of dramatics at university. When he confessed to his father that he wanted to be an actor, his father grinned and said: "That's all right son so long as you are a good one." His eldest brother, George Eldredge, also became an actor.

Career

He began his theatrical career in repertory and then in comic opera and later played small parts in New York City till he made a hit on Broadway and it was a role opposite Lillian Gish that won him a Warners film contract.

Eldredge's Broadway credits include Three-Cornered Moon (1932), The Good Fairy (1932), Katerina (1928), The Cherry Orchard (1928), and The Would-be Gentleman (1928).

On 05/28/1959, he played Mr Preston on episode of Leave It to Beaver
In 1954–1955, Eldredge played Harry Archer, father of the title character, in the CBS Television situation comedy Meet Corliss Archer.

Death
He died September 23, 1961, at his home in Treasure Island Trailer Park in Laguna Beach, California, where he was recovering from a heart attack. His remains are interred at Pacific View Memorial Park in Corona del Mar, California.

Filmography

Film

Television

References

External links

 
 
 

American male film actors
1904 births
1961 deaths
Male actors from San Francisco
20th-century American male actors
American male television actors
American male stage actors
Burials at Pacific View Memorial Park